The Right Reverend Stephen McGill PSS (4 January 1912 – 9 November 2005) was the sixth Bishop of Argyll and the Isles and second Bishop of Paisley.

Early life
Stephen McGill was born on 4 January 1912 to Peter McGill and Charlotte Connolly in Glasgow, Scotland where he was educated at Holy Cross primary school and St Aloysius' College before entering the national junior seminary at St Mary's College, Blairs, Aberdeen.

Priesthood
In October 1931 he entered Le Grand Séminaire at Coutances in France and was ordained priest of the Archdiocese of Glasgow at St Andrew's Cathedral, Glasgow by Bishop Henry Grey Graham on 29 June 1936. Following his ordination he returned to France where he entered the novitiate of the Sulpicians at Issy-les-Moulineaux, Paris and was incardinated priest of St Sulpice (PSS) in July of the following year. Further studies were undertaken at the Institut Catholique in Paris where he gained his licentiate in sacred theology (STL) in 1939.

Thereafter he was appointed to the staff of Le Grand Séminaire at Bordeaux in October 1939 and transferred to Le Grand Séminaire at Aix-en-Provence in January 1940. At this point the Second World War was under way in Europe so, following the fall of France to the Germans in June 1940, Father McGill, as a British citizen, had to make his escape via Marseille and Spain to avoid internment as an enemy alien.

On his return to Scotland he was appointed to the staff of St Mary's in Blairs where he remained as spiritual director until he was appointed rector in 1951. In 1952 he was made an honorary canon of the Glasgow cathedral chapter.

Episcopate
When Bishop Kenneth Grant of Argyll and the Isles died suddenly in 1959 Canon McGill was appointed to succeed him by Pope John XXIII and was consecrated bishop in St Columba's Cathedral, Oban on 22 June 1960. During his time in Argyll and the Isles Bishop McGill attended sessions of the Second Vatican Council (1962 - 1965) and oversaw translation of the liturgy into Gaelic.

On the death of Bishop James Black in March 1968 Bishop McGill was translated by Pope Paul VI to the see of Paisley  as his successor. There he remained until his retirement in March 1988.

Final years
In retirement Stephen McGill maintained his interest in priestly formation and was a prolific letter writer. He died peacefully in his ninety fourth year on 9 November 2005 at Nazareth House, Cardonald, Glasgow. His motto was, in Latin, Per Tuas Semitas ("By Your Ways") taken from the hymn 'Panis angelicus' by St Thomas Aquinas.

References
  Paisley Daily Express

Sources
 The Catholic Directory for Scotland 2006 (Glasgow, 2006)

Clergy from Glasgow
Roman Catholic bishops of Argyll and the Isles
Roman Catholic bishops of Paisley
People from Renfrewshire
1912 births
2005 deaths
People educated at St Aloysius' College, Glasgow
20th-century Roman Catholic bishops in Scotland
Scottish Roman Catholic bishops
Sulpician bishops